A parabola is a mathematical curve.

Parabola or Parabole may also refer to:

Arches

 Parabolic arch

Music
 Parabola (album), an album by Gil Evans
 "Parabola" (song), a song by Tool
"Parabola", a song by Jawbreaker from Bivouac

Other uses
 Parabola (magazine), a magazine published by The Society for the Study of Myth and Tradition
 Parabola (moth), a genus of moth
 Parabola (operating system), a GNU/Linux-libre distribution
 Parabola Allegory, a Rosicrucian allegory attributed to Hinricus Madathanus

See also
 Parable
 Parabola of safety